Barbara Joan Higgins (born September 21, 1962) is best known in Southern Alberta for her 21 year career as senior anchor, writer and producer of the 6 o'clock news for CTV Calgary. As a journalist and documentarian, Higgins brought a critical eye to the evening news.  After a total of 26 years as a journalist, in July, 2010 Higgins left her post at CTV to enter the Calgary mayoral election.

Biography
Barbara Joan Higgins was born September 21, 1962, in Edmonton, Alberta. She graduated from Ross Sheppard High School in 1979 and enrolled in Business Administration at NAIT. After two years of study in Business Administration, she transferred to NAIT's Radio and Television Arts. Higgins worked with both CBC and CTV affiliates in Alberta, British Columbia, Manitoba and Saskatchewan. She moved to Calgary in March 1989.

On July 23, 2010, Higgins announced her intention to run as a candidate for mayor in the 2010 Calgary civic election to be held that October. She subsequently described herself as a fiscal conservative with a heart.
Her campaign rhetoric has centred on setting the tone at City Hall and empowering civic employees to develop solutions to address Calgary's $60-million budget shortfall. 
In the election, Higgins won the votes of over 90-thousand Calgarians and placed third behind Naheed Nenshi and Ric McIver.

Awards and honours 
Winner of 'Best News Series' from the Radio and Television News Directors Association for her 3-part series on Calgary firefighter Greg McDougal's battle with the Workers Compensation Board.
Winner of the 'Best of Festival' award at CanPro and winner of 'Most Inspirational' award at the Alberta Motion Picture Industry Association (AMPIA) for her documentary Running on Empty.
Queen's Diamond Jubilee Award.
Peter Legge Philanthropy Award.
UNICEF Volunteer of the Year Award. 
City of Calgary White Hat Award.
Two time winner of Calgary's Top 40 Under 40

References

1962 births
Living people
Canadian television news anchors
People from Edmonton
Journalists from Alberta
Canadian women television journalists